Bugae Station is a subway station located in Bupyeong-gu, a district in Incheon, South Korea. This station is on the Seoul Subway Line 1.

Vicinity
Exit 1: Bugae Elementary School
Exit 2: Bugae High School

References

Seoul Metropolitan Subway stations
Metro stations in Incheon
Railway stations opened in 1996
Bupyeong District